Ryan Patrick Colucci (born 1978) is an American feature film producer, writer and comic book creator.

Early life
Originally from Levittown, New York, he grew up in Syosset, New York.

Career
After graduating from USC's Peter Stark Producing Program, he worked at Snoot Entertainment, where he was a producer on the CG-animated feature Battle for Terra. That film premiered at the 2007 Toronto International Film Festival and was released on May 1, 2009 from Lionsgate and Roadside Attractions, in both 2D and 3D.  It was on the Academy Award short-list for the Best Animated Film Oscar in 2009.

Colucci's feature film White Space is currently in post-production, in association with Spoke Lane Entertainment.

He is  attached to produce George R.R. Martin's The Skin Trade, the World Fantasy Award-Winning horror novella from the Dark Visions compilation book.

In 2007, Colucci founded Spoke Lane Entertainment, a feature film and publishing company.  Their first graphic novel Harbor Moon debuted at San Diego Comic-Con in July 2010 through Shuster Award-winning publisher Arcana Studio and was officially published in April 2011. Colucci and Spoke Lane then released the graphic novel R.E.M. in 2013 at NY Comic-con.

Filmography 
 Battle for Terra (2009)
 With You (2014)	
 Suburban Cowboy (2017)	
 Orient City: Ronin & The Princess (2017)
 White Space (post-production)

References

External links
 

Film producers from New York (state)
Living people
1978 births
People from Levittown, New York
USC School of Cinematic Arts alumni
People from Syosset, New York